The 1972 BYU Cougars football team represented Brigham Young University (BYU) for the 1972 NCAA University Division football season. It was their first year under head coach LaVell Edwards and the Cougars finished over .500 for the first time since 1969.

Schedule

Preseason

Defensive coordinator LaVell Edwards was promoted to head coach in January to take over for the departed Tommy Hudspeth, who ended up as the head coach at UTEP by season's end.

BYU was returning 28 players from the previous year but Golden Richards would not be one of them. Richards claimed it was because the Cougars were still a run-oriented offense while BYU and Edwards said it was because Richards had trouble keeping with his academics.

Personnel

Starters

Offense

Defense

Season summary

Kansas State
Pete Van Valkenburg rushed for 164 yards on 16 carries, scored on a 59-yard run in the first quarter and set up Dave Terry for BYU's second touchdown. Keith Brumley's 37-yard field goal was Kansas State's only points through the first three quarters. Henry Childs caught a 27-yard touchdown pass from Dennis Morrison three minutes into the final quarter for Kansas State.

Utah State

at Oregon State

at Long Beach State

UTEP

Arizona State

at Colorado State

Wyoming

at Arizona

at Utah

BYU's first win versus Utah since 1967

at New Mexico

Statistics

Passing

Rushing

Receiving

Awards 

All-WAC: Dave Atkinson, Dan Hansen, Paul Howard, Paul Linford, Ron Tree, Pete Van Valkenburg 

WAC Coach of the Year: LaVell Edwards

References

BYU
BYU Cougars football seasons
BYU Cougars football